The Libertador Bolivarian Municipality is the only administrative division of the Capital District and along with the municipalities of Baruta, Chacao, El Hatillo and Sucre forms the Metropolitan District of Caracas. It is landlocked by Vargas State and also borders Miranda State on the east and south. The municipality is one of a number in Venezuela named "Libertador Municipality", in honour of Venezuelan independence hero Simón Bolívar.

It is the largest in terms of population, with approximately 2.1 million inhabitants.

In this municipality is home to the Miraflores presidential palace, the Federal Legislative Palace, the National Electoral Council, the main offices of PDVSA and CANTV, the Central Bank of Venezuela and the public ministry.

History 

It was first established in 1901 under the name of Libertador Department; with the Department of Vargas (now Vargas Municipality, it formed the Federal District of Venezuela.

In 1986, its name was changed to Libertador District.  Following the creation of the Vargas State in 1998, it became the sole administrative division of the Federal District.

Under the 1999 constitution, the Federal District ceased to exist and the Capital District was created. Under the new terms of administrative divisions, Libertador became a municipality, consisting of 22 parishes.

In 2000, the Metropolitan District of Caracas was formed from Libertador and four other municipalities: Baruta, Chacao, El Hatillo, and Sucre.

Geography 

The Libertador Municipality is located in the mid-north of the country surrounded by the mountain El Ávila which is part of the Venezuelan central range. It borders by the north with the Vargas State, by the south and east with the Baruta Municipality of the Miranda State and by the west with the Aragua State. The Municipality includes the Los Chaguaramos neighborhood.

Climate

The climate is characteristically tropical with the temperature varying according to the altitude with an annual temperature of  being the warmest of the five municipalities that forms Caracas.

Economy

The vast majority of the population works for the public sector. It is also the most important commercial centre of the country since the Central Bank of Venezuela is located there. Tourism is the next largest economic activity in the municipality as the historical centre of the city is there. Informal commerce is also predominant in the area.

Government

The Venezuelan constitution specifies that the municipal governments are divided by executive; governed by the mayor, and legislative branches; governed by the municipal council comprising thirteen members, both offices are elected through universal and secret suffrage.

The Libertador Municipality does not belong to any state therefore it doesn't have a governor but instead a Head of Government of the Capital District which is appointed by the President of the Republic.

Since August 2009 the municipality publishes a newspaper, Ciudad CCS.

Mayors
Claudio Fermín (1989-1992)
Aristóbulo Istúriz (1992-1995)
Antonio Ledezma (1995-2000)
Freddy Bernal (2000-2008)
Jorge Rodríguez (2008-2017)
Erika Farías (2017-2021)

Parishes
The Libertador Municipality comprised 22 parishes out of the 32 that contains Caracas

Demographics
The Libertador Municipality represents only 0.22% of the countrywide territory but is home to more than 2 million people and represents half of the total population of Caracas and a density of 4,816.36/km2. On the other hand, the entire area is urbanized.

As of 2006, Libertador was estimated to contain the world's second-largest mega-slum.

See also
Caracas
Capital District (Venezuela)

References

External links
Libertador Municipality website

Geography of Caracas
Municipalities of Capital District (Venezuela)
Slums in South America